Chikun is a Local Government Area in central Kaduna State, Nigeria. It has an area of 4,466 km, and had a population of 372,272 as at the 2006 census. Its headquarters is in the town of Kujama. The postal code of the area is 2438000.

Boundaries
Chikun Local Government Area shares boundaries with Kachia Local Government Area to the south, Kajuru Local Government Area to the east, Kaduna South Local Government Area to the northeast, Igabi Local Government Area to the northeast, Birnin Gwari Local Government Area to the northwest and Niger State to west, respectively.

Administrative subdivisions
Chikun Local Government Area consists of 12 subdivisions called Wards (second-order administrative divisions), namely:
 Chikun
 Gwagwada
 Kakau
 Kujama
 Kunai
 Kuriga
 Narayi
 Nassarawa
 Rido
 Sabon Gari Nassarawa
 Sabon Tasha
 Yelwa

History
Chikun Local Government Area derives its name from a Gbagyi village named Chikun in the southeastern part of Kujama. The area was originally populated by the Gbagyi people but is now being subsumed by urbanization making it a cosmopolitan part of Kaduna.

On 5 July 2021, over 100 secondary school pupils were kidnapped.

Demographics

Population
Chikun Local Government Area according to the March 21, 2006 national population census was put at 372,272. Its population was projected by the National Population Commission of Nigeria and National Bureau of Statistics to be 502,500 by March 21, 2016.

People

Indigenous people
The indigenous people are the Gbagyi people. They also make up the major population in the area.

Other people

Kingship
Esu Chikun (recently Sa-Gbagyi), Danjuma Shekwonugaza Barde of Gbagyi, is the traditional ruler of the area. The jurisdiction of the royal Chief covers the entire Chikun Local Government Area  and parts of Kaduna South Local Government Area of Television village and Romi New Extension.

See also 
List of villages in Kaduna State

References

Local Government Areas in Kaduna State